The non-marine molluscs of Sri Lanka are a part of the molluscan wildlife of Sri Lanka.

Naggs et al. (2003) listed 246 land gastropods for Sri Lanka. Ranawana (2006) listed 18 species of non-indigenous land gastropods in Sri Lanka and he added some species to that list.

The fauna of Sri Lanka also includes freshwater snails and freshwater bivalves.

Land Snails
Phylum: Mollusca   Class: Gastropoda
When considering mollusc diversity in Sri Lanka, snails are the major group that can be found within the island. About 246 land snails are known to occur in Sri Lanka, with 83% of endemism. This include 5 endemic and relict land snails. Majority of land snails are pulmonates.

Endemic species are highlighted with an asterisk (*).

Subclass: Pulmonata

Family: Acavidae 
 Acavus haemastoma*
 Acavus phoenix*
 Acavus superbus*
 Oligospira polei*
 Oligospira skinneri*
 Oligospira waltoni*

Family: Achatinidae - Giant land snails
 Achatina fulica

Family: Ariophantidae 
 
 Cryptozona bistrialis
 Cryptozona ceraria*
 Cryptozona chenui*
 Cryptozona Juliana*
 Cryptozona novella*
 Cryptozona semirugata
 Euplecta acuducta
 Euplecta albnonata
 Euplecta binoyaensis*
 Euplecta colletti*
 Euplecta concavospira*
 Euplectu emiliana*
 Euplecta gardeneri*
 Euplecta hyphasma*
 Euplecta indica
 Euplecta isabellina*
 Euplecta laevis*
 Euplecta lankaensis*
 Euplecta layardi*
 Euplecta neglecta*
 Euplecta partita*
 Euplecta phidias*
 Euplecta prestoni*
 Euplecta rosamonda*
 Euplecta scobinoides*
 Euplecta semidecussata
 Euplecta subopaca*
 Euplecta trimeni*
 Euplecta turritella
 Euplecta travancoricii = Euplecta praeeminens
 Euplecta verrucula*
 Macrochlamys mdica
 Macrochlamys kandiensis*
 Macrochlamys neaps*
 Macrochlamys perfucata*
 Macrochlamys tratanensis*
 Macrachlmys umbrina*
 Macrachlmy vilipensa
 Macrochlamys woodiana
 Microcystina bintennensis*
 Microcystina lita*
 Mariaella dussumieri
 Ratnadvipia irradians*
 Ratnadvipia karui*
 Ravana politissima*
 Sitala operiens*
 Sitala phyll.ophila*
 Sitala pyramidalis*
 Satiella membranacea*

Family: Bradybaenidae 
 Bradybaena similaris

Succineidae
 Succinea ceylanica

Family: Buliminidae 
 Mirus panos*
 Mirus proletaria*
 Mirus stalix*

Family: Camaenidae 
 Beddomea albizonatus*
 Beddomea ceylanicus*
 Beddomea intermedius*
 Beddomea frifasciatus*
 Trachia fallaciosa
 Trachia vittata
 Landouria radleyi*

Family: Cerastidae 
 Rachis punctatus
 Rhachistia adumhratus*
 Rhachistia pulcher

Family: Charopidae 
 Ruthvenia biciliata*
 Ruthvenia caliginosa*
 Ruthvenia clathratula*
 Thysanota elegans*
 Thysanota eumita*
 Thysanota hispida*

Family: Clausiliidae - Door snails
 Phaedusa ceylanica*

Family: Corillidae 
 
 Corilla adamsi*
 Corilla beddomeae *
 Corilla carabmata*
 Corilla colletti*
 Corilla erronea*
 Corilla fryae*
 Corilla giidei*
 Corilla humberti*
 Corilla lesleyae*
 Corilla odontophora*

Family: Diplommatinidae 
 Nicida catathymia*
 Nicida ceylamca*
 Nicida delectabilis*
 Nicida lankaensis*
 Nicida pedronis*
 Nicida prestomi*

Family: Endodontidae 
 
 Philalanka circumsculpta*
 Philalanka depressa*
 Philalanka edithae*
 Philalanka lamcabensis*
 Philalanka liratula*
 Philalanka mononema*
 Philalanka secessa*
 Philalanka sinhila*
 Philalanka thwaitesi*
 Philalanka trifilosa*

Family: Euconulidae - Hive snails
 Eurychlamys layardi*
 Eurychlamys regulala*
 Eurychltiniys winifredae*

Family: Ferussaciidae 
 Digoniaxis cingalensis*

Family: Gastrodontidae 
 Zonitoides arboreus

Family: Glessulidae 
 
 Glessula capillacea
 Glessula ceylanica*
 Glessula collettae*
 Glessula deshayesi
 Glessula fulgens*
 Glessula inornata*
 Glessula lankana*
 Glessula layardi*
 Glessula nitens*
 Glessula pachycheila*
 Glessula pullens*
 Glessula panaethu*
 Glessula pwahilis*
 Glessula prestoni*
 Glessula punctogallana*
 Glessula pusilla
 Glessula reynelli*
 Glessula sattaraensis
 Glessula serena*
 Glessula simony*
 Glessula sinhila*
 Glessula veruina*

Family: Helicarionidae 
 Kaliella barrakporensis
 Kaliella colletti*
 Kaliella delectabilis*
 Kaliella leithiana*
 Kaliella salicensis*
 Sivella galerus*
 Sivella hyptiucyclos*

Family: Agriolimacidae - Keelback slugs
 Deroceras reticulatum

Family: Planorbidae - Ramshorn snails
 Indoplanorbis exustus

Family: Pupillidae 
 Microstele muscerda
 Pupoides coenopictus

Family: Pupinidae 
 
 Tortulosa aurea*
 Tortulosa austeniana*
 Tortulosa barnaclei*
 Tortulosa blanfordi*
 Tortulosa colletti*
 Tortulosa congener*
 Tortulosa connectens*
 Tortulosa cumingi*
 Tortulosa decora*
 Tortulosa duplicate*
 Tortulosa eurytrema*
 Tortulosa greeni*
 Tortulosa haemastoma*
 Tortulosa hartleyi*
 Tortulosa layardi*
 Tortulosa leucocheilus*
 Tortulosa marginata*
 Tortulosa nevilli*
 Tortulosa metneri*
 Tortulosa prestoni*
 Tortulosa pyramidata*
 Tortulosa rugosa*
 Tortulosa smithi*
 Tortulosa sykesi*
 Tortulosa templemani*
 Tortulosa thwaitesi*

Family: Pyramidulidae 
 Pyramidula halyi*

Family: Streptaxidae 
 Indoartemon cingalensis*
 Indoartemon gracilis*
 Indoartemon layardianus*
 Perrottetia peroteti
 Perrottetia ravanae*
 Gulella bicolor
 Sinoennea planguncula

Family: Subulinidae 
 
 Subulina octona
 Allopeas gracile
 Allopeas layardi*
 Allopeas marine*
 Allopeas prestoni*
 Allopeas pussilus
 Allopeas sykesi
 Paropeas achatinaceum
 Zootecus insularis

Family: Cyclophoridae 
 
 Cyclophorus alabastrimis*
 Cyclophorus ceylanicus**
 Cyclophorus involvulus
 Cyclophorus menkeanus
 Aulopoma grande**
 Aulopoma helicinum**
 Aulopoma itieri**
 Aulopoma sphaeroideum**
 Cyathopoma album
 Cyathopoma artatum**
 Cyathopoma ceylanicum**
 Cyathopoma colletti**
 Cyathopoma conoideum**
 Cyathopoma innocens**
 Cyathopoma leptomita*
 Cyathopoma mariae*
 Cyathopoma ogdenianum*
 Cyathopoma perconoideum*
 Cyathopoma prestoni*
 Cyathopoma serendibense*
 Cyathopoma turbinatum*
 Cyathopoma uvaense*
 Japonia binoyae*
 Japonia occulta*
 Japonia vesca*
 Leptopoma apicatum*
 Leptopoma elatum*
 Leptopoma semiclausum*
 Leptopomoides conulus*
 Leptopomoides flammeus*
 Leptopomoides halophilus*
 Leptopomoides orophilus*
 Leptopomoides poecilus*
 Leptopomoides taprobanensis*
 Micraulax coeloconus
 Scabrina brounae (Sykes, 1898)
 Scabrina liratula (Preston, 1909)
 Theobaldius annulatus*
 Theobaldius bairdi*
 Theobaldius cadiscus*
 Theobaldius cratera*
 Theobaldius cytopoma*
 Theobaldius layardi*
 Theobaldius liliputianus*
 Theobaldius loxostoma*
 Theobaldius parapsis*
 Theobaldius parma*
 Theobaldius subplicatulus*
 Theobaldius thwaitesi*
 Pterocyclus bifrons*
 Pterocyclus bilabialus
 Pterocyclus cingalensis*
 Pterocyclus cumingi
 Pterocyclus troscheli*

Family: Vertiginidae - Whorl snails
 Gastrocopta mimula*
 Nesopupa cinghalensis*
 Pupisoma longstaffae*
 Pupisoma miccyla*

Family: Viviparidae - River snails
 Bellamya bengalensis
 Bellamya dissimilis

Family: Truncatellidae - Looping snails
 Truncatella ceylanica

Family: Thiaridae - Trumpet snails
 Thiara lineata

Freshwater bivalves

See also
 List of marine molluscs of Sri Lanka
 List of non-marine molluscs of India

References

External links
 Biological diversity of Sri Lanka
 http://slendemics.net/easl/invertibrates/snails/landsnails.html
 http://www.ybasrilanka.org/2011/01/land-snails-of-sri-lanka.html
 http://www.environmentlanka.com/yba/snails.php

Non-Marine molluscs

Lists of biota of Sri Lanka
Sri Lanka
Sri Lanka